Donald James DePaolo is an American professor of geochemistry in the Department of Earth and Planetary Science at the University of California, Berkeley and Associate Laboratory Director for Energy and Environmental Sciences at the Lawrence Berkeley National Laboratory.

Biographical summary 
Donald J. DePaolo was born in 1951. He grew up in upstate New York.

Career 
DePaolo received his B.S. degree with Honors in Geology from Binghamton University in 1973 and earned his Ph.D. in geology with a minor in chemistry under Gerald Wasserburg at the California Institute of Technology in 1978.  In the same year, DePaolo began an assistant professorship at the University of California, Los Angeles Department of Geology and Geochemistry and subsequently earned his associate (1981–1983) and full professorship (1983–1988).  In 1988, he began his term as Professor of Geochemistry at the University of California, Berkeley in the Department of Earth and Planetary Science, with a joint appointment as a Faculty Scientist in the Earth Sciences Division at the Lawrence Berkeley National Laboratory (LBNL) [1].  Upon his arrival in Berkeley, Dr. DePaolo established the Center for Isotope Geochemistry, a joint research facility between LBNL and UC Berkeley [2].  In 1998, he was made the Class of 1951 Professor of Geochemistry, and served as chair of the department from 1990 to 1993.  From 1998 to 2006 DePaolo served as Geochemistry Department Head at LBNL, in 2007 he became Earth Sciences Division Director and from 2010 to 2011 he served as Acting Associate Laboratory Director for Energy and Environmental Sciences before accepting the position permanently on April 1, 2011.  In Spring of 2009, DePaolo became the Director of the Center for Nanoscale Control of Geologic  (EFRC) [3].

Research interests 
DePaolo has coauthored over 170 peer-reviewed articles and reviews. His research interests focus on using naturally occurring isotope variations to explore questions such as

 Origin of the deep-source Hawaiian plume and other hotspots and theories on mantle dynamics [4]
 Tracking fluids moving through groundwater systems, with application to tracing contaminants
 Understanding isotope fractionation of molten materials
 Magma chamber processes and life cycles of volcanoes
 Isotopic evidence that may lead to detecting life on other planets
 Chronology studies of both difficult-to-date young volcanic rocks and ancient continental rocks
 Isotopic composition of old ocean sediments, with implications for climate shifts

Major contributions
In his early career, DePaolo pioneered the use of samarium and neodymium  isotope ratios to constrain the age and chemical evolution of rocks. DePaolo and his then advisor Gerald Wasserburg made the first Nd isotope measurements on terrestrial igneous rocks [5]. An important byproduct of this work was the development of epsilon notation (ε), with which initial 143Nd/144Nd values could be distinguished from the chondritic uniform reservoir (CHUR) in parts per ten thousand. Key principles of the Nd isotope system were laid out in his 1988 book, Neodymium Isotope Geochemistry: An Introduction.

DePaolo's work has since led to significant advances in using various isotope systems to constrain rates of metamorphic processes [6], quantify continental weathering and elemental seawater budgets through geologic time [7][8], and model fluid-rock interactions [9]. As principal investigator of the Hawaii Scientific Drilling Project (HSDP), DePaolo and coworkers sampled the flank of Mauna Kea volcano to a depth of several kilometers. Major findings included a determination of the geochemical structure of the Hawaiian mantle plume [10]. DePaolo's recent research provides a framework for understanding the partitioning of stable isotopes during mineral growth, with a focus on isotopes of calcium [11].

Recent service
 2008 DOE/Basic Energy Sciences/BESAC subcommittee on New Era Science
 2005-2008 Chair NRC Committee on Grand Research Questions in Earth Sciences
 2003-2008 NSF Continental Dynamics Panel, EAR
 2004-2008 Science Advisory Committee SAFOD
 2007-2010 Day Medal Committee, GSA
 2002- Board of Directors, Berkeley Geochronology Center
 2005-2008 CIDER steering Committee

Special Awards and Honors 
 2019 V. M. Goldschmidt Award
 2014 Harry H. Hess Medal
 2009 Fellow, American Association for the Advancement of Science
 2000 Urey Medal, European Assoc. of Geochemistry
 2000 John Simon Guggenheim Fellow
 1999 Arthur L. Day Medal, Geol. S
 1997-98 Miller Research Professor, U.C. Berkeley
 1997 Geochemistry Fellow, Geochem. Soc. and EAG
 1997 Fellow, Geological Soc. Am
 1994-95 Fulbright Senior Scholar, Australia National University
 1994 Fellow, American Academy of Arts and Sciences
 1993 Member, National Academy of Sciences
 1992 Fellow, California Academy of Sciences
 1987 Mineralogical Society of America Award
 1987 Fellow, Mineralogical Society of America
 1983 J.B. MacElwane Award, American Geophysical Union
 1983 Fellow, American Geophysical Union
 1978 F.W. Clarke Medal, Geochemical Society

References

External links 
 [1] DePaolo's UC-Berkeley webpage
 [2] Center for Isotope Geochemistry
 [3] Center for Nanoscale Control of Geologic CO2
 [4] HSDP
 [5] Nd Isotopic Variations and Petrogenetic Models
 [6] Rates of Tectonometamorphic Processes from Rubidium and Strontium Isotopes in Garnet
 [7] Seawater Strontium Isotopic Variations from 2.5 Million Years Ago to the Present
 [8] Isotopic Evidence for Variations in the Marine Calcium Cycle Over the Cenozoic
 [9] Isotopic effects in fracture-dominated reactive fluid–rock systems
 [10] Deep Drilling into a Mantle Plume Volcano
 [11] Surface kinetic model for isotopic and trace element fractionation during precipitation of calcite from aqueous solutions

1951 births
Living people
American geochemists
University of California, Berkeley faculty
Binghamton University alumni
California Institute of Technology alumni
University of California, Los Angeles faculty
Members of the United States National Academy of Sciences
Fellows of the American Geophysical Union
Recipients of the V. M. Goldschmidt Award